St. Thomas College, Pala is a government aided college of higher education located in Pala town, Kerala, India. It was founded on 7 August 1950 by the Syro-Malabar Catholic Eparchy of Palai.
The college is affiliated to Mahatma Gandhi University Kottayam and was re-accredited  with A++ grade by NAAC in February 2021. The college is recognized under the sections 2(f) and 12B of the UGC Act 1956. The Government of Kerala has recognized the college as a Special Grade College.

History
Founded in 1950.  The main block, "Tisserant Hall", called A-block, stoutly built with an enormous roof span and massive columns was ready to house the administration, classrooms, laboratories and libraries in 1953.  The first Prime Minister of India Pandit Jawaharlal Nehru visited the college in 1954.
In 1981 Rt. Rev. Dr. Joseph Pallickaparambil took over as the Bishop of Palai and the patron of St. Thomas College. In 2005 H.E. Bishop Mar Joseph Kallarangattu became the Bishop of Palai and the Patron of the college. 
The college celebrated its Silver Jubilee in 1976 with Prime Minister Mrs. Indira Gandhi as the chief guest.  The preceding decade had been one of hectic academic activity during which more Post graduate courses- English, Physics, Economics and Mathematics were started, new hostels inaugurated, more blocks added to the cluster of buildings in the campus etc.  Rev. Dr. N.M. Thomas, who succeeded Fr. Joseph Kureethadam as principal in 1968, retired from service in the jubilee year passing the baton to Prof. P.M. Chacko.  Fr. James Vellankal followed Prof. Chacko in 1984. The successors of Fr. Vellankal included an illustrious line of academic administrators combining erudition with sharp acumen  - Fr. O.P. Eanas (1986-1991), Fr. Philip Njaralakkattu (1991-1995), Rev. Dr. Kurian Mattam (1995-2001) and Rev. Dr. M.M. Mathew Maleparambil (2001–06). During 2006-09  Rev. Dr. Mathew John K was officiated as the drawing and disbursement officer.

Accreditation 
The National Assessment and Accreditation Council (NAAC) has awarded A++ Grade to St.Thomas' College with CGPA score 3.56. Furthermore, UGC has recognised St. Thomas College as one among the six colleges in Kerala accorded with the status of 'College with Potential for Excellence'(CPE).

Notable alumni 
Reji Joseph Pulluthuruthiyil - Famous Indian journalist 
V. Joseph Thomas - IPS, ex-DGP of Kerala
Anto Antony - member of parliament
T K Jose IAS
Don Max - Indian film director and editor
Jimmy George - Volleyball Player
Roshy Augustine - Minister for Water Resources, Government of Kerala
Sibi George - Indian civil servant, ambassador of India to Kuwait
Paul Zacharia - Indian Writer
Miya George - Indian Actress
T J Jacob - Police officer
Jose Chacko Periappuram - Indian Cardiac Surgeon

References

External links
 

Catholic universities and colleges in India
Universities and colleges in Kottayam district
Education in Pala, Kerala
Educational institutions established in 1950
1950 establishments in India
Arts and Science colleges in Kerala
Colleges affiliated to Mahatma Gandhi University, Kerala